The Minister of Commerce and Consumer Affairs is a minister in the government of New Zealand with the responsibilities including corporate law and governance, financial markets, competition policy, consumer policy, protecting intellectual property, and trade policy and international regulatory cooperation, most of which is administered by the Ministry of Business, Innovation and Employment. The position was established as Minister of Commerce in 1987 and superseded the previous office of Minister of Trade and Industry.

Starting from October 2014, the position was combined with the now-disestablished Minister of Consumer Affairs.

The present Minister is Duncan Webb.

List of ministers
The following ministers held the office of Minister of Commerce and Consumer Affairs.

Key

Notes

References

External links
New Zealand Ministry for Business, Employment and Innovation

Commerce
Economy of New Zealand